Lee Hyo-jung may refer to:

Lee Hyo-jung (actor) (Hanja: 李曉庭, born 1961), South Korean actor
Lee Hyo-jung (badminton) (Hanja: 李孝貞, born 1981), South Korean badminton player